Charisma Christian Church is an Evangelical church located in Le Blanc-Mesnil, Île-de-France.

History
It was established in 1989 by the Portuguese pastor Nuno Pedro, a former member of Assemblies of God. 
This church is composed of Christians from all over the Paris region, many of whom are originally from the Antilles and from Africa. The church has grown regularly, 300 new people visit its services each month. It aims to "Lead people to faith in Jesus Christ" and speaks of "prosperity, triumph and success" as the will of God for the faithful. Since 2002, several affiliated churches are established in various cities of France.

In 2012, the church had 4,000 people in Paris, and 3,000 in France, for a total of 7,000.

See also
List of the largest evangelical churches
List of the largest evangelical church auditoriums
Worship service (evangelicalism)

References

External links
 Official site

Evangelical denominations established in the 20th century
Christian organizations established in 1989
Christian new religious movements
Christian denominations founded in France
Charismatic churches in France
Evangelical megachurches in France